Eastern Alabama Railway, LLC  is one of many short line railroad companies owned by Genesee & Wyoming, Inc.  On November 26, 1990, the line was sold by CSX to the Eastern Alabama Railway, a subsidiary of Kyle Railways.  Kyle Railways later sold the EARY to RailAmerica in 2002 and RailAmerica was acquired by Genesee & Wyoming in 2012.

On July 19, 1889, the Anniston & Atlantic Railroad became part of the Louisville and Nashville Railroad under the Alabama Mineral Railroad. The L&N became part of the Seaboard System in 1982 and the CSX in 1986.

The EARY also operated a separate line running from Wellington to Anniston, Alabama.  The Wellington line was abandoned in November 1992.  The Wellington line was also former Louisville & Nashville track and ran through Alexandria - Mahlep - Gladden Jct - Leatherwood - Blue Mountain.

Traffic
The railroad's main commodities are limestone, urea, paper products, and food products.  The EARY hauled around 15,000 carloads in 2008.

Towns Served
Talladega, Alabama Interchange with the Norfolk Southern Railway and CSX
Bemiston, Alabama 
Sycamore, Alabama
Sylacauga, Alabama Location of Enginehouse and interchange with Norfolk Southern
Gantts Quarry, Alabama

Summary of Operations
Anniston and Atlantic Railroad 1883 - 1889
Louisville and Nashville Railroad/Alabama Mineral Railroad: 1889 - 1982
Seaboard System Railroad: 1982 - July 1, 1986
CSX Transportation: July 1, 1986 - November 26, 1990

See also

List of United States railroads
List of Alabama railroads

Sources 

Edward A. Lewis, American Shortline Railway Guide 5th ed., (Kalmbach Books, 1996).
Mike Walker, SPV's Comprehensive Railroad Atlas of North America - Southern States (Steam Powered Publishing & SPV, 2001) Ownership and detail of rail line.
North America Railroad Map Software v 2.13, (Railway Station Productions, 2004)

External links
Eastern Alabama Railway official webpage - Genesee and Wyoming website

Alabama railroads
RailAmerica
Spin-offs of CSX Transportation